Members of the New South Wales Legislative Council were mostly elected at the 1933 election. A further 15 were elected by a joint sitting of the New South Wales Parliament in December 1936. The President was Sir John Peden.

See also
Second Stevens Ministry
Third Stevens ministry

References

Members of New South Wales parliaments by term
20th-century Australian politicians